Presto was the browser engine of the Opera web browser from the release of Opera 7 on 28 January 2003, until the release of Opera 15 on 2 July 2013, at which time Opera switched to using the Blink engine that was originally created for Chromium. Presto was also used to power the Opera Mini and Opera Mobile browsers.

Presto is a dynamic engine. Web pages can be re-rendered completely or partially in response to DOM events. Its releases saw a number of bug fixes and optimizations to improve the speed of the ECMAScript (JavaScript) engine. It is  proprietary and only available as a part of the Opera browsers.

ECMAScript engines
A succession of ECMAScript engines have been used with Opera. (For the origin of their names, see Cultural notes below.) Pre-Presto versions of Opera used the Linear A engine. Opera versions based on the Core fork of Presto, Opera 7.0 through 9.27, used the Linear B engine. The Futhark engine is used in some versions on the Core 2 fork of Presto, namely Opera 9.5 to Opera 10.10. When released it was the fastest engine around, but in 2008 a new generation of ECMAScript engines from Google (V8), Mozilla (SpiderMonkey), and Apple (JavaScriptCore) took one more step, introducing native code generation. This opened up for potential heavy computations on the client side and Futhark, though still fast and efficient, was unable to keep up.

In early 2009, Opera introduced the Carakan engine. It featured register-based bytecode, native code generation, automatic object classification, and overall performance improvements. Early access in the Opera 10.50 pre-alpha showed that it is as fast as the fastest competitors, being the winner in 2 out of the 3 most used benchmarks.

History and development

Presto-based applications

Web browsers
Opera
Opera 7 to 12
Opera Mobile 9.5 to 12
Opera Mini (continues to use Presto rendering on an intermediate server on keypad phones and as Extreme mode on Android devices)
Nintendo
Nintendo DS Browser (based on Opera)
Nintendo DSi Browser (based on Opera)
Wii Internet Channel Browser (based on Opera)
Nokia 770 Browser (based on Opera)
Sony Mylo COM-1's Browser (based on Opera)

HTML editors
Macromedia Dreamweaver MX to Dreamweaver CS3 (CS4/CS5 use WebKit)
Adobe Creative Suite 2 and 3

Source code leak 
The source code for version 12.15 was leaked to GitHub on February 11, 2016. It remained unnoticed until January 12, 2017 and was taken down two days later in response to a DMCA request. Opera Software has confirmed the authenticity of the source code.

Cultural notes
The ECMAScript engines used with Opera have been named after ancient and traditional writing scripts, including ancient Greek Linear A and Linear B, Runic Futhark, and Javanese Carakan.

See also
 Blink (web engine)
 V8 (JavaScript engine)

References

External links
Opera Developer Community – Presto 2.1 – web standards supported by Opera’s core
Opera Developer Community

2003 software
History of the Internet
Layout engines
Opera Software
Internet leaks